St. Petersburg station may refer to:

St. Petersburg station (Amtrak), former Amtrak train station in St. Petersburg, Florida
Seaboard Coast Line Railroad station (St. Petersburg, Florida), former train station in St. Petersburg, Florida
Moscow Passazhirskaya railway station, formerly Peterburgsky or St. Petersburg Station